Portage is a city in and the county seat of Columbia County, Wisconsin, United States. The population was 10,581 at the 2020 census, making it the largest city in Columbia County. The city is part of the Madison Metropolitan Statistical Area.

Portage was named for the Fox-Wisconsin Waterway, a portage between the Fox River and the Wisconsin River, which was recognized by Jacques Marquette and Louis Joliet during their discovery of a route to the Mississippi River in 1673. The city's slogan is "Where the North Begins."

History 

The Native American tribes that once lived here, and later the European traders and settlers, took advantage of the lowlands between the Fox and Wisconsin Rivers as a natural "portage". This is reflected in indigenous names for the town, such as the Menominee name Kahkāmohnakaneh, which means "at the short cut". In May 1673, Jacques Marquette joined the expedition of Louis Jolliet, a French-Canadian explorer, to find the Mississippi River. They departed from St. Ignace on May 17, with two canoes and five voyageurs of French-Indian ancestry (Métis). They followed Lake Michigan to Green Bay and up the Fox River, nearly to its headwaters. From there, they were told to portage their canoes a distance of slightly less than two miles through marsh and oak plains to the Wisconsin River. Later, French fur traders described the place as "le portage", which eventually lent itself to the name of the community. As a portage, this community developed as a center of commerce and trade; later, a canal was constructed to facilitate this trade. When the railroads came through, the community continued in this role.

Portage emerged at this place because of its unique position along the one and a half mile strip of marshy floodplain between the Fox and Wisconsin Rivers. By the end of the 17th century, the Fox-Wisconsin waterway, linked at The Portage, served as the major fur trade thoroughfare between Green Bay and Prairie du Chien. It was not until the 1780s and 1790s that traders built their posts and warehouses at each end of The Portage.  In the early 19th century Portage was primarily populated by Métis.  In 1828, the federal government recognized the strategic economic importance of The Portage and built Fort Winnebago at the Fox River end. After 15 years of controversy, Winnebago settlement (now Portage) won the county seat in 1851.  The community incorporated as Portage City in 1854.

The Portage business district lies along a hill that overlooks the Portage Canal. The buildings now in the city's downtown were once part of a bustling, urban commercial center serving a large region across north central Wisconsin. The building of the city paralleled its commercial prominence between the end of the American Civil War and the second decade of the 20th century.

Historic sites

 Fort Winnebago Surgeon's Quarters Historic Site
 Fox-Wisconsin Portage Site
 Henry Merrell House
 Old Indian Agency House
 Portage Industrial Waterfront Historic District
 Portage Retail Historic District
 Zona Gale House
 Museum at the Portage
 Wisconsin American Legion Museum and Learning Center
 Portage Canal Society
 Historic Portage Canal
 World War II History Museum
 Wisconsin State Historical Markers in Portage
 Fort Winnebago Surgeon's Quarters Historic Site
 Frederick Jackson Turner
 Jacques Marquette 
 Jacques Marquette and Louis Jolliet
 Ketchum's Point
 Potter's Emigration Society
 Society Hill Historic District
 Zona Gale
 Veterans memorials
 Revolutionary War Veteran (Cooper Pixley and Alexander Porter)
 To Honor Pierre Pauquette
 To the Memory of Our Historic Dead
 Daughters of the American Revolution Historic Markers
 Site of Fort Winnebago / Surrender of Red Bird
 Pierre Pauquette and East End of Wauona Trail
Landing Place of the Ferry Built by Pierre Pauquette

Geography 

Portage lies in the Wisconsin River valley. The city is surrounded by prairies and grasslands. Approximately three miles (5 km) west of the city are the Baraboo bluffs. The location of the town at the split of the Wisconsin and Fox river is what gives it the name "Portage", which means carrying a boat of its cargo between two navigable waters. In addition to the rivers, the city has access to Swan Lake and Silver Lake.

Cityscape 
When Portage was first established, the streets were laid out on a traditional grid system. Today, the streets of the outlying city are contorted as a result of the many marshes and lowlands that run through much of Columbia County. The northern side of the city thus looks different from the central city, with the organized grid street system giving way to a more suburban streetscape with a lower housing density.

The city has two commercial areas. One is the downtown historic district, which features several small boutique shops and restaurants; the other is the Northridge commercial area that features big box stores. In the summer of 2007, the Portage Canal was cleaned up and now features a bike path that runs alongside part of it. In the summer of 2008, the main downtown street was redone. Historical landmarks of the city include the Museum at the Portage, the Indian Agency house, and the Surgeons Quarters.

Climate

Demographics

2010 census
As of the census of 2010, there were 10,324 people, 4,060 households, and 2,349 families living in the city. The racial makeup of the city was 90.9% White, 5.0% African American, 0.9% Native American, 0.8% Asian, 0.7% from other races, and 1.6% from two or more races. Hispanic or Latino of any race were 4.0% of the population.

There were 4,060 households, of which 31.0% had children under the age of 18 living with them, 40.5% were married couples living together, 11.9% had a female householder with no husband present, 5.4% had a male householder with no wife present, and 42.1% were non-families. 34.8% of all households were made up of individuals, and 14.1% had someone living alone who was 65 years of age or older. The average household size was 2.27 and the average family size was 2.90.

The median age in the city was 37.2 years. 22.1% of residents were under the age of 18; 8.6% were between the ages of 18 and 24; 30.6% were from 25 to 44; 24.8% were from 45 to 64; and 13.9% were 65 years of age or older. The gender makeup of the city was 53.7% male and 46.3% female.

2000 census
As of the census of 2000, there were 9,728 people, 3,770 households, and 2,228 families living in the city. The population density was 1,172.9 people per square mile (453.1/km2). There were 3,970 housing units at an average density of 478.7 per square mile (184.9/km2). The racial makeup of the city was 92.76% European-American, 3.90% African American, 0.51% Native American, 0.71% Asian, 0.05% Pacific Islander, 0.85% from other races, and 1.21% from two or more races. Hispanic or Latino of any race were 3.39% of the population.

There were 3,770 households, out of which 30.1% had children under the age of 18 living with them, 44.5% were married couples living together, 10.7% had a female householder with no husband present, and 40.9% were non-families. 34.5% of all households were made up of individuals, and 14.4% had someone living alone who was 65 years of age or older. The average household size was 2.30 and the average family size was 2.96.

In the city, the population was spread out, with 23.3% under the age of 18, 10.6% from 18 to 24, 31.7% from 25 to 44, 19.3% from 45 to 64, and 15.2% who were 65 years of age or older. The median age was 36 years. For every 100 females, there were 106.1 males. For every 100 females age 18 and over, there were 108.7 males.

The median income for a household in the city was $35,815, and the median income for a family was $44,804. Males had a median income of $33,158 versus $23,478 for females. The per capita income for the city was $18,039. About 4.6% of families and 7.2% of the population were below the poverty line, including 7.5% of those under age 18 and 7.8% of those age 65 or over.

Education 

Portage Community School District serves Portage.

Portage High School (Wisconsin) was recently upgraded to a larger building, with the older high school building now housing the Wayne E. Bartels Middle School. Portage has three elementary schools: John Muir, Woodridge, and Rusch. Three rural elementary schools serve three of the towns in Columbia County: Lewiston, Fort Winnebago, and Caledonia. There are also two private schools: St. John's Lutheran and St. Mary's Catholic Schools. The Madison Area Technical College, also has a campus located in Portage.

The Portage scheme of support for children with special educational needs was developed in the city.

Infrastructure

Corrections 
Wisconsin Department of Corrections operates the Columbia Correctional Institution.

Transportation

Major highways
Three interstate highways, Interstate 94, Interstate 90, and Interstate 39 run past Portage, giving the city a 30-minute commute to Madison and 15-minute commute to Wisconsin Dells. The city also lies only a few hours from Milwaukee, Chicago, and Minneapolis/ Saint Paul, Minnesota.

Rail
Portage is served by Amtrak's Empire Builder between Chicago and Seattle or Portland, with a train stopping there in each direction every day. Freight railroad service is provided by the Canadian Pacific Railway which does business in the American Midwest as the Soo Line Railroad.
 Portage (Amtrak station)

Intercity bus
Portage is served by intercity bus from Milwaukee via Madison and to Wisconsin Rapids via Stevens Point, with a bus stopping in each direction daily at the Portage station.
List of intercity bus stops in Wisconsin

Airport
 Portage Municipal Airport (C47) serves the city and surrounding communities.

Notable people 

 Earl Abell, member of the College Football Hall of Fame
 Alvin Alden, Wisconsin politician
 Walt Ambrose, NFL player
 Josiah D. Arnold, Wisconsin politician
 Levi W. Barden, Wisconsin politician
 Everett Bidwell, Wisconsin politician
 Peter J. Boylan, U.S. Army general, President of Georgia Military College
 Ben Brancel, Wisconsin politician
 Samuel S. Brannan, Wisconsin politician and newspaper editor
 Llywelyn Breese, Wisconsin politician, former Secretary of State 
 Guy W.S. Castle, Medal of Honor recipient
 Maureen Clark, U.S. Olympian
 William W. Corning, Wisconsin politician
 Jeffrey Dahmer, imprisoned at Columbia Correctional Institution in Portage
 Luther S. Dixon, Chief Justice of the Wisconsin Supreme Court
 Thomas E. Fairchild, Judge of the U.S. Court of Appeals
 Russel C. Falconer, Wisconsin politician
 Zona Gale, writer, Pulitzer Prize winner (first woman to win the Pulitzer Prize for drama, 1921)
 Charles Randall Gallett, Wisconsin politician
 B. Frank Goodell, Wisconsin politician
 Henry Gunderson, Lieutenant Governor of Wisconsin
 Joshua James Guppey, Union Army general
 Frank A. Haskell, Union Army colonel, author of a noted account of the Battle of Gettysburg
 Philip Hayes, U.S. Army general
 Charles W. Henney, U.S. Representative
 John Edward Kelley, U.S. Representative from South Dakota
 Herman Lange, Wisconsin politician
 Margery Latimer, writer
 James J. Lindsay, U.S. Army general
 Wellington Porter McFail, aviator
 Hugh McFarlane, Wisconsin politician
 John Muir, naturalist
 William Owen, Wisconsin politician
 Russell W. Peterson, former Governor of Delaware
 Russ Rebholz, head coach of the Winnipeg Blue Bombers, member of the Canadian Football Hall of Fame; head coach of the University of Wisconsin-Milwaukee Panthers men's basketball team
 Ferdinand Schulze, Wisconsin politician
 Mike Thompson, NFL player
 Yellow Thunder, chief of the Ho-Chunk (or Winnebago) tribe
 Andrew Jackson Turner, writer, newspaper editor, politician
 Frederick Jackson Turner, historian, Pulitzer Prize winner
 Samuel K. Vaughan, Union Army general
 Joan Wade, Wisconsin politician
 Jabez H. Wells, Wisconsin politician

Images

References

External links 

 City of Portage
 Portage Chamber of Commerce

 
Cities in Wisconsin
Cities in Columbia County, Wisconsin
Portages in the United States
County seats in Wisconsin
Populated places established in 1854
1854 establishments in Wisconsin